The Sheriff of Wigtown was historically the office responsible for enforcing law and order in Wigtown, Scotland and bringing criminals to justice. Prior to 1748 most sheriffdoms were held on a hereditary basis. From that date, following the Jacobite uprising of 1745, the hereditary sheriffs were replaced by salaried sheriff-deputes, qualified advocates who were members of the Scottish Bar.

It became known as the Sheriff of Wigton & Kirkcudbright in 1860 and was dissolved and incorporated into the sheriffdom of Dumfries & Galloway in 1874.

The Stewartry of Kirkcudbright was created in 1369, when the area between the Rivers Nith and Cree was granted to Archibald the Grim. A steward was appointed by to administer the area which was known the "Stewartry".

Sheriffs of Wigtown

Robert FitzTrute (c.1200)
Alexander Comyn (1263-1266)
John Comyn, Master of Buchan (1288)
Walter of Twynham (1296)
Domhnall mac Cailein c.1298
John Comyn, Earl of Buchan (1300)
Thomas McCulloch (1305)
William Douglas of Leawalt (1424)
Andrew Agnew (1456)
Thomas Boyd, Earl of Arran (1468)
Andrew Agnew (1468)
John Graham (1648)
Andrew Agnew (?-1747)

Sheriffs-Depute
Alexander Boswell, 1748–1750 
Andrew Pringle, 1750–1751  (Sheriff of Selkirk, 1751)
Thomas Dundas, 1751– 
Alexander Spalding Gordon, –1794 
John Busby Maitland, 1794–1818 
James Walker, 1818–c.1840 
Adam Urquhart 1843–1860

Stewards of Kirkcudbright
Donald Maclellen of Gelston, 1456
William Edmonstoune of Duntreath, 1462
John Kennedy of Blairquhan, 1463
Thomas Boyd, Earl of Arran, 1468
Humphrey Colquhoun, 1468
Patrick Hepburn, 1st Earl of Bothwell, 1489
Robert Maxwell, 5th Lord Maxwell, 1526

Sheriffs of Kirkcudbright
Thomas Miller, Lord Glenlee, 1748–1755
David Ross, 1756–1763
Alexander Gordon, Lord Rockville, 1764–1784 
Sir Alexander Gordon, 1784–1830
Alexander Wood of Woodcote, 1830–1841
Erskine Douglas Sandford, 1841–1860

Sheriffs of Wigton & Kirkcudbright (1860)
Erskine Douglas Sandford, 1860–61 
 David Hector, 1861-1874 
For sheriffs after 1874 see Sheriff of Dumfries and Galloway

See also
 Historical development of Scottish sheriffdoms

References

Sheriff courts
Sheriff